This is a list of bridges and tunnels on the National Register of Historic Places in the U.S. state of Illinois.

Notes

 
Illinois
Bridges
Bridges